Debendra Pradhan (born 16 July 1941) is an Indian politician and a member of the Bharatiya Janata Party. He served as minister of state for surface transport and agriculture in the Second Vajpayee ministry.

Pradhan was born on 16 July 1941 in undivided Dhenkanal District of Odisha and studied MBBS. He was elected to the 13th Lok Sabha from Deogarh constituency. He is also a member of the Rashtriya Swayamsevak Sangh. His son Dharmendra Pradhan is a Rajya Sabha MP from Madhya Pradesh and Union Minister of Education, Skill Development & Entrepreneurship in Narendra Modi Government.

Offices
President, BJP, Talcher Mandal (1980 -1983)
District President of undivided Dhenkanal District of BJP (1983 – 1985)
District President of undivided Dhenkanal District of BJP (1985 -1988) 
State President of BJP, Odisha (1988 (February) – 1990)
Re-elected as State President (BJP), Odisha (1990 – 1993)
State General Secretary of BJP, Odisha (1993 – 1995)
Re-elected as State President of BJP, Odisha (1995 – 1997)
National Executive Member, BJP (1997 – 1998)
Elected as Member of Parliament to 12th Loka Sabha, Deogarh Parliamentary Constituency, Odisha (1998)
Union Minister of State for Surface Transport (1998 - 1999)
Re-elected as Member of Parliament to 13th Loka Sabha, Deogarh Parliamentary Constituency (1999 – 2004)
Union Minister of State, Surface Transport & Minister of State for Agriculture (1999 – 2001)
National Vice President of BJP (2001 – 2002)

References

External links 



People from Debagarh district
Bharatiya Janata Party politicians from Odisha
India MPs 1999–2004
1941 births
Living people
Lok Sabha members from Odisha
People from Angul district
India MPs 1998–1999